Umbilicaria americana, commonly known as frosted rock tripe, is a foliose lichen of rock faces.

Description
Umbilicaria americana has been described as looking like "grayish-white potato chips." The upper surface is gray with the appearance of white dusting.  The lower surface is black.  The lobes are 2 to 7 cm in diameter.

References

americana
Lichen species
Lichens described in 1993
Lichens of North America
Taxa named by Thomas Hawkes Nash III
Taxa named by Josef Poelt